The magnetic diffusivity is a parameter in plasma physics which appears in the magnetic Reynolds number. It has SI units of m²/s and is defined as:
,
while in Gaussian units it can be defined as
.
In case of a plasma, this is the conductivity due to Coulomb or neutral collisions: , where
  is the electron density.
  is the electron charge.
  is the electron mass.
  is the collision frequency.

See also

 Electrical resistivity and conductivity

References

Plasma physics